Luba Lukova is an American visual artist, known for her thought-provoking images and expressive poster designs. Her work has won international acclaim, and is represented in the permanent collections of the Museum of Modern Art, New York, Denver Art Museum, the Library of Congress in Washington, DC, and Bibliothèque Nationale de France in Paris.

Biography
Lukova was born in Plovdiv, Bulgaria, and studied at the National Academy of Fine Arts in Sofia. She moved to the United States in 1991, after traveling to participate in the Colorado International Invitational Poster Exhibition; shortly thereafter, she was hired by the New York Times Book Review and established her studio in New York City. Lukova's work is exhibited around the world and has won many awards including: Grand Prix Savignac at the International Poster Salon in Paris, ICOGRADA Excellence Award, and Reisman Foundation Award. She holds an honorary doctoral degree from the Art Institute of Boston.

Work 
Lukova is known for using bold contrasts, visual metaphors, and highly focused concepts to create images that take "only seconds to grasp meaning." Stylistically, her work has been compared to that of German Expressionists, Escher, and Picasso, and she cites inspiration from Goya, Rembrandt, Käthe Kollwitz, folk art, and Chekov. Her art incorporates vivid colors, simplified figures and hand-rendered typography, and frequently comments on social issues including income inequality, censorship, corruption, and environmental conditions. "Her seemingly simple, two- or three-color images carry the emotive power of expressionist wood engravings [...] Lukova's vocabulary is the human body, stretched, deformed, twisted gracefully and grotesquely." These themes are prominent in her Social Justice 2008 series of posters, as well as works for Nobel Prize-winning humanitarian organizations, universities, Broadway productions, non-profit organizations, Shakespeare plays, choreographers, and the War Resisters League.

Exhibitions

Selected solo exhibitions 
 Luba Lukova: Designing Justice, National Underground Railroad Freedom Center, Cincinnati, Ohio, 2021–2022
 Luba Lukova: Designing Justice, Jewish Museum Milwaukee, Wisconsin, 2020–2021
 Luba Lukova: Designing Justice, Museum of Design Atlanta, Georgia, 2017
 Graphic Guts: The Art of Luba Lukova, Glassel Gallery, Baton Rouge, Louisiana, 2015
 Graphic Guts, Gold Coast Arts Center, Great Neck, New York, 2015
 I Have a Dream, UAB Visual Arts Gallery, Birmingham, Alabama, 2012
 Social Justice and Other Works, Fairbanks Gallery, Portland, Oregon, 2009
 Umbrellas, Social Justice & More, La Galleria at LaMaMa, New York, 2009
 Umbrellas, Social Justice & More: Two Exhibitions by Luba Lukova, The Art Institute of Boston, Massachusetts, 2008
 The Printed Woman, an installation with prints by Luba Lukova, La Galleria at LaMaMa, New York, 2001

References

Further reading 
 Brazell, Derek; Davies, Jo. Understanding Illustration. London, 2014. 
 Lukova, Luba. Social Justice 2008: 12 Posters by Luba Lukova. Clay & Gold, 2008. 
 Quinn, Therese; Ploof, John; Hochtritt, Lisa. Art and Social Justice Education: Culture as Commons. Routledge, New York, 2012. .
 Roberts, Lucienne. Good: an Introduction to Ethics in Graphic Design. AVA Academia, Worthing, Lausanne, 2006. .

External links 
 Luba Lukova's website
 Luba Lukova on Facebook
 Luba Lukova on Flickr

Artists from Plovdiv
American women artists
American poster artists
Year of birth missing (living people)
Living people
Women graphic designers
21st-century American women